Ashtin Zamzow (born August 13, 1996) is an American track and field athlete, known for multiple events. She was the 2015 Pan American Junior Champion in the heptathlon. She currently competes for the University of Texas.

Professional

NCAA
Ashtin Zamzow is a Texas Longhorns track and field alum and won 4 Big 12 Conference titles. Ashtin Zamzow is a 1-time USTFCCCA NCAA Division I First-Team All-American (1 at Texas) and 2-time USTFCCCA Second-Team All-American at Texas.

Prep and personal life
Ashtin Zamzow previously competed for Texas A&M University, the alma mater of her parents, Kalleen Madden and Stacy Zamzow.

While at Goliad High School, she was the Texas UIL State Champion at 100 meters and 300 meters hurdles.

References

External links
 
 
 Interview with one of the Top Track Athletes in the Country Ashtin Zamzow - Published on May 31, 2019 What's Behind The Game
 Ashtin Zamzow - Track & Field 2019 profile at University of Texas
 Ashtin Zamzow - Track & Field 2015 profile at Texas A&M University
 
 
 ASHTIN ZAMZOW BECOMES FIRST LONGHORNS ATHLETE TO WIN HEPTATHLON AT CLYDE LITTLEFIELD TEXAS RELAYS at Runnerspace.com
 Ashtin Zamzow stats at Milesplit.com

1996 births
Living people
American heptathletes
Texas Longhorns women's track and field athletes
Texas A&M Aggies women's track and field athletes
People from Goliad, Texas
Track and field athletes from San Antonio
Sportspeople from Corpus Christi, Texas
20th-century American women
21st-century American women